Gustave Vanderstappen (1883 – 20 September 1955) was a Belgian footballer. He played in four matches for the Belgium national football team from 1905 to 1908.

References

External links
 

1883 births
1955 deaths
Belgian footballers
Belgium international footballers
Place of birth missing
Association football forwards